Omo Ranch is an unincorporated community in El Dorado County, California.

A post office operated at Omo Ranch from 1888 to 1974. The name Omo comes from a Native American village.

References

Unincorporated communities in California
Unincorporated communities in El Dorado County, California